28 Hotel Rooms is an American film written and directed by Matt Ross and starring Chris Messina and Marin Ireland. It is Matt Ross' first feature film.

Premise
A novelist and a corporate accountant conduct an affair over a period of several years, meeting only when they are each traveling for work in a city far from their homes. The film takes a minimalist approach: it consists entirely of scenes between the two of them in hotel rooms.

Cast
 Marin Ireland as woman
 Chris Messina as man
 Robert Deamer as bartender
 Brett Collier as bar patron
 Devin Schumacher - Hotel Concierge

Production
Matt Ross' original idea was to make an intimate film about a relationship that would primarily focus on characters rather than plot. He stated that "the genesis of this movie came out of conversations I had with Chris Messina".

After two weeks of rehearsal filming began in Los Angeles and continued for a week or two. During this time Marin Ireland was flying back and forth between Los Angeles and New York, where she was filming the HBO miniseries Mildred Pierce. The film was edited during the next couple of months, and it was determined that certain additional scenes were needed to help further define the relationship between the two characters. These last remaining scenes were shot in New York over the course of about another week. Filming took in total about 18 days.

Before and during the shooting of the film Ross encouraged the actors to collaborate in its development, resulting in more than 49 hours of material, some of it scripted and some improvised. During postproduction, many different complete versions of film were created, with scenes in different orders, different plots, and different beginnings or endings, before one version was selected as final.

Critical response
On Rotten Tomatoes the film has an approval rating of 47% based on reviews from 15 critics. Metacritic gave it a score of 50% based on reviews from 10 critics.

Variety found the film "neither dramatically nor intellectually stimulating despite good chemistry between the lead actors". Slant gave it 1.5 out of 4 stars. The Village Voice felt that the characters weren't properly fleshed out, and that the film's stripped-down, minimalist approach prevented a sense of getting insight into their lives. The New York Times was also unimpressed, praising the quality of the acting but noting a lack of any dramatic tension drama or passion in the characters' relationships with each other.

References

External links
 28 Hotel Rooms at the Internet Movie Database

2012 films
Films directed by Matt Ross (actor)
2012 drama films
American drama films
Films set in hotels
Films with screenplays by Matt Ross (actor)
2012 directorial debut films
2010s English-language films
2010s American films
2012 independent films
American independent films